Pierluigi Crescenzi (a.k.a. Pilu Crescenzi) is a full professor of computer science at the Gran Sasso Science Institute. His research areas include theoretical computer science and computer science education. He has been teaching at Sapienza University of Rome, University of Florence and Université Paris Diderot. 

Crescenzi has completed his PhD in Computer Science under the supervision of Daniel Pierre Bovet. He is the co-author of several textbooks in various areas of computer science, including computational complexity, approximation algorithms, and programming. Among his notable students, there is Luca Trevisan.

References

External links 
 Crescenzi's home page

Italian computer scientists
Living people
Year of birth missing (living people)